Perry–Houston County Airport  is a public airport located four miles (6 km) northwest of the central business district of Perry, a city in Houston County, Georgia, United States and  south of Warner Robins, Georgia. It is owned by the Perry–Houston County Airport Authority. It is used for general aviation, mainly flight training.

Overview
Although most U.S. airports use the same three-letter location identifier for the FAA and IATA, Perry–Houston County Airport is assigned PXE by the FAA but has no designation from the IATA.

Facilities and aircraft 
For the 12-month period ending January 31, 2006, the airport had 22,000 general aviation aircraft operations, an average of 60 per day. There are 84 aircraft based at this airport: 91% single-engine, 6% multi-engine and 3% helicopter.

History 
Opened in July 1942, during World War II, the Perry–Houston County airport was used as an auxiliary training airfield for the Army pilot school at Cochran Army Airfield. With the end of the war, it was turned over to the city of Perry and developed into a municipal airport which opened in May 1947.

See also

 Georgia World War II Army Airfields

References 

 WWII Airfield Database - Georgia

External links 
 Perry–Houston County Airport (PXE) at Georgia DOT website
 

Airfields of the United States Army Air Forces in Georgia (U.S. state)
Airports in Georgia (U.S. state)
Buildings and structures in Houston County, Georgia
Transportation in Houston County, Georgia